Anastasia Potapova defeated Petra Martić in the final, 6–3, 6–1 to win the singles tennis title at the 2023 Linz Open.

Alison Riske-Amritraj was the reigning champion, from when the event was last held in 2021, but chose not to compete this year.

Seeds

Draw

Finals

Top half

Bottom half

Qualifying

Seeds

Qualifiers

Lucky losers

Qualifying draw

First qualifier

Second qualifier

Third qualifier

Fourth qualifier

Fifth qualifier

Sixth qualifier

References

External links 
 Main draw
 Qualifying draw
 Player list

2023 WTA Tour